Faasaleleaga is a district  of Samoa situated on the eastern side of Savaii island. It has a population of 13,566 (2016 Census).

The traditional capital is Safotulafai where district chiefs and orators meet at Fuifatu malae. Safotulafai was the main base of the 'Mau a Pule' resistance movement against colonial rule, which grew into the national Mau movement and eventually Samoa's political independence in 1962. Safotulafai  also  has  close  traditional  links  with  Saleaula,  the  main village of the Gaga'emauga district.

Faasaleleaga  is  a  major  Malietoa area with close  political  ties to the Tuamasaga district on Upolu island.  Safotulafai  is  always  consulted  by  Malie village (Tuamasaga)  in  conjunction  with  Manono  (Aiga-i-le-Tai)  in  the  election  of  Malietoa  title-holders.

Historically, another  important  village  in  this  district  is  Sapapalii,  where  John Williams,  the  first  missionary  to  bring  Christianity  to  Samoa,  landed in 1830. It  was  here  that Malietoa  Vaiinupo  received  Williams. Sapapali'i had become the  second  Malietoa  base  in  the  district  in  1750  when  Malietoa  Ti'a  moved  here.

In  the 20th  century,  Salelologa has become the main township for shopping and public amenities on the island. Salelologa wharf is the main ferry terminal for inter-island passenger and vehicle boats between Savaii and Mulifanua wharf on Upolu.

Maota Airport is the main airfield on the island, located 10 minutes south of Salelologa.

The village of Tuasivi, 10 minutes north of Salelologa, is the main government (Malo) administration centre on the island with a district hospital, courthouses, police station and post office.

Geographically, Faasaleleaga district is located at latitude (-13.67 degrees) 13° 40' 11" south of the equator and longitude (-172.12 degrees) 172° 7' 12" west of the prime meridian on the world map.

See also
List of schools in Savai'i

References

 
Districts of Samoa